Crazy Lixx is a Swedish glam metal band, formed in Malmö in 2002. The group belongs to the Swedish hard rock scene, with influences from bands like Guns N' Roses, Aerosmith, Kiss, Whitesnake, Alice Cooper, Def Leppard and Mötley Crüe.

History

Foundation and Loud Minority (2002–2009)
Crazy Lixx was founded in late 2002 by Danny Rexon and Vic Zino, in an attempt to bring back 1980s-style glam metal. After Joél Cirera was asked to be the drummer, the core of the band was formed.

They began playing in local clubs and in 2007 released their debut album Loud Minority with the local label, Swedmetal Records. The album, while not a huge commercial success, was well received within the music community, being ranked at #3 in Sleaze Rock's Reader's Top Twenty Albums of 2007.

After only a few shows with the band, Vic Zino left the band in 2009 due to artistic differences. Shortly after, he was invited to replace guitarist Thomas Silver in the band Hardcore Superstar, where he remains to this day.

New Religion, Riot Avenue and Crazy Lixx (2009–2014)
With the line-up reformed, in 2009 Crazy Lixx signed a contract with the Italian label Frontiers Records. In 2010, the band released its second studio album, New Religion.

In April 2012, Crazy Lixx released their third studio album entitled Riot Avenue. This album is rawer than their previous efforts and is sometimes considered somewhat of a dark horse album. Nonetheless, it includes songs considered to be some of their best, from the track opener Whiskey Tango Foxtrot to the album closer, the power ballad Only The Dead Know.

In September 2014, Crazy Lixx announced their fourth studio album would be self-titled and released in Europe on November 7 and in the United States on November 11 on Frontiers Records.

New lineup, Friday the 13th, Ruff Justice and Forever Wild (2015–present)
In August 2015, it was announced through the official website of Crazy Lixx that guitarist Edd Liam and songwriting guitarist Andy Zäta had left the band. The news article said that Edd had personal reasons to do so, while Andy was instead involved with the British band Inglorious. Lead singer Danny Rexon added that "the band's future existence [was] at stake".

Later that month, Crazy Lixx began to look for new guitarists and potential lyricists, allowing anyone to apply for these positions.

In February 2016, the band released a music video for the song "All Looks, No Hooks", featuring new guitarists Chrisse Olsson and Jens Lundgren. The band's first live album was released on 8 May 2016, and consisted of songs recorded in July 2015, which was the last show with guitarist Andreas Zäta Eriksson.

In 2016 it was disclosed that Crazy Lixx would appear at the three-day Rockingham 2016 melodic/hard rock festival, held in Nottingham, United Kingdom. They appeared on Saturday 22 October, fourth in a seven-act line-up headlined by Steelheart.

On February 9, 2017, Crazy Lixx announced an upcoming album titled Ruff Justice, to be released on April 21 of that year. The album contains three songs that also appear in Friday the 13th: The Game. The first album single "XIII", which serves as the theme song for the game, was released on March 2.

Crazy Lixx's sixth studio album Forever Wild (2019) comprises 10 tracks. Their latest album, Street Lethal, was released in November 2021 with mainly positive reviews.

Band members

Current members
Danny Rexon – vocals, guitar  (2002–present)
Joél Cirera – drums (2002–present)
Jens Anderson – bass (2012–present)
Chrisse Olsson – guitar (2016–present)
Jens Lundgren – guitar (2016–present)

Past members
Vic Zino – guitar (2002-2008)
Loke Rivano – bass (2005-2011)
Christian Edvardsson (Edd Liam) – guitar (2010–2015)
Andreas Eriksson (Andy Zata) – guitar (2008–2015)

Timeline

Discography

Studio albums

Live albums

References

Musical groups established in 2002
Musical quintets
Swedish glam metal musical groups
Swedish hard rock musical groups